{{DISPLAYTITLE:2,3-(S)-Hexahydroxydiphenoyl-D-glucose}}

2,3-(S)-Hexahydroxydiphenoyl--glucose is an hydrolyzable tannin that can be found in Eucalyptus delegatensis, the Alpine ash (Myrtaceae), in Terminalia catappa, the Bengal almond, and Combretum glutinosum (both Combretaceae).

References 

Hydrolysable tannins
Heterocyclic compounds with 4 rings
Oxygen heterocycles